Azatbek Asanbekovich Omurbekov (born 17 September 1983) is a Soviet-born Russian colonel who reportedly heads the 64th Separate Motor Rifle Brigade of the Russian Ground Forces. Omurbekov led the unit during its deployment in Ukraine as part of the Russian invasion of Ukraine, during which the unit committed war crimes in the town of Bucha. He has been referred to in the media and by the European Union as "Butcher of Bucha".

In 2022, Omurbekov was sanctioned by the European Union, the United Kingdom, and Canada for his actions in Ukraine. The United States sanctioned the entire 64th Brigade.

Personal life
Azatbek Asanbekovich Omurbekov was born on September 17, 1983. There are conflicting reports where he was born. Social media suggests he was born in Jaynak, Kashka-Suu, Aksy District in the Kirghiz Soviet Socialist Republic. Media reports indicate that Omurbekov was born in Soviet Uzbekistan. His grandfather, a veteran of the Eastern Front during World War II, is from Nukus, Karakalpakstan. His father, Federal Security Service (FSB) Colonel Asan Omurbekov, served in the military all his life, including guarding the Kyrgyz border for nearly 10 years. His brother, Askarbek Omurbekov, is reportedly lieutenant colonel in the Russian FSB.

Russian military career
In 2014, Omurbekov received an award for outstanding service from then Russian deputy defense minister Dmitry Bulgakov.

In November 2021, Omurbekov reportedly received a blessing from the Russian Orthodox Church.

By the time of the Russian invasion of Ukraine in February 2022, Omurbekov commanded 64th Separate Guards Motor Rifle Brigade of the 35th Combined Arms Army in the Russian Army. According to the European Untion, the unit "killed, raped and tortured civilians in Bucha, Ukraine" during the Bucha massacre that occurred while the city was under Russian occupation in March. In April, the United Kingdom sanctioned Omurbekov for his "involvement in the Bucha massacre". In May, Canada added Omurbekov to its sanctions list. In June, European Union sanctioned Omurbekov for his role as commander of the 64th Brigade, claiming Omurbekov had "direct responsibility in killings, rapes and torture in Bucha." The United States sanctioned the entire 64th Brigade for "killed numerous civilians, detained civilians, beat detained civilians, conducted mock executions of civilians, dismembered civilians including removing parts of their scalps and removing their limbs, burned civilians, and seized and damaged civilian homes and property" in Bucha.

Omurbekov and the 64th Brigade's role in Bucha were first reported by Ukrainian NGO InformNapalm.

By July 13, 2022, Russian President Vladimir Putin was awarded the title of Hero of the Russian Federation, Russia's highest award, in a secret ceremony.

References

1983 births
Living people
Russian military personnel of the 2022 Russian invasion of Ukraine
Kyiv offensive (2022)
Russian military leaders
Russian people of Kyrgyzstani descent
Fugitives wanted by Ukraine
Russian individuals subject to European Union sanctions
Russian individuals subject to United Kingdom sanctions
Heroes of the Russian Federation